The 2016–17 NWHL season is the second season of operation of the National Women's Hockey League. All four teams from the inaugural season returned for this season: the Boston Pride, Buffalo Beauts, Connecticut Whale, and New York Riveters.

League business

Team locations
During the off-season, the Connecticut Whale moved to Northford Ice Pavilion in North Branford, Connecticut, and the defending champion Boston Pride moved to the new Warrior Ice Arena in the Boston neighborhood of Brighton.

On August 1, 2016, it was announced that the New York Riveters moved from Brooklyn to the Barnabas Health Hockey House in Newark, New Jersey, situated within the Prudential Center as the New Jersey Devils practice arena. The facility was the site of the first Isobel Cup finals the previous season.

With the changes in arenas, it left the Buffalo Beauts, playing their second season at Harborcenter, as the sole team not to change arenas.

League news
August 2, 2016: The league announced a partnership with You Can Play, which also saw each team feature an ambassador.
August 4, 2016: The league announced that all four inaugural season jersey designs would be retired and replaced with new designs voted upon by fans.
October 7, 2016: Buffalo Beauts player Hailey Browne became the first transgender athlete in professional North American team sports, asking to be referred to by the name Harrison Browne. As the hormone treatments involved with gender transition violate anti-doping regulations, Browne would remain fully biologically female during his playing career. Browne initially retired at the end of the season to with plans to start a full transition, but returned to play for the Metropolitan Riveters the following season.
November 17, 2016: Part way into the league's second season, the NWHL informed its players that they would all be getting up to a 50% pay cut. The league claims the pay cut is needed in order to sustain the longevity of the league. This dropped the league player minimums to $5,000 per player. Five weeks later, in an attempt to partially compensate for the salary rollback, the league introduced an incentive program where players from the home team split the revenue generated by tickets sold in excess of 500 after each game.
February 3, 2017: The league announced that the season and playoffs would be shortened to accommodate for the players' participation in the 2017 IIHF Women's World Championship and preparations for the 2018 Olympic teams. The season was originally set to end on April 16, following a three-week break for the World Championships. The regular season was instead scheduled to end on March 12 and then followed by a single-game Isobel Cup playoff semifinals and final to be held March 17–19.

All-star game

The 2nd NWHL All-Star Game was held in Pittsburgh, Pennsylvania, the first NWHL game to be played outside of its four markets. Amanda Kessel and Kelley Steadman were named as All-Star captains. Kessel would go on to score the first hat trick in NWHL All-Star history.

Regular season

Standings

Playoffs

Statistics

Scoring leaders
The following players led the league in regular season points at the conclusion of season.

Awards and honors
 Brianna Decker, Boston Pride, 2017 NWHL Most Valuable Player
 Brianna Decker, Boston Pride, 2017 NWHL Scoring Champion
 Ashley Johnston, New York Riveters, 2017 NWHL Denna Laing Perseverance Award
 Megan Bozek, Buffalo Beauts, 2017 NWHL Defensive Player of the Year Award
 Katie Fitzgerald, New York Riveters, 2017 NWHL Goaltender of the Year

Transactions

Draft

The 2016 NWHL Draft took place on June 18, 2016, and was the second in league history. Defender Kelsey Koelzer of Princeton was selected first overall by the New York Riveters.

Free agency

Trades

Retired

References

External links
NWHL website

 
NWHL